Lingbao Tianzun, also known in English as the Heavenly Lord of Spiritual Treasures, is a Taoist god. Also known as Shangqing, he is numbered among the Three Pure Ones who head some forms of the Taoist pantheon.

Temples
The Dongxuan Palace in the Zhujia'ao Valley beside  in Shanxi is dedicated to the Lord of Lingbao. His statue in its main hall is covered by a ring of light; his eyes are thought to "contain the mysteries of the universe".

References

Bibliography
 .

Chinese gods
Deities in Taoism